This is a list of countries by total  greenhouse gas (GHG) emissions per capita by year. It provides data based on a production-based accounting of emissions of carbon dioxide, methane, nitrous oxide, perfluorocarbon, hydrofluorocarbon, and sulfur hexafluoride (meaning emissions within the territory of the given country), compiled by the World Resources Institute and divided by the population estimate by the United Nations (for July 1) of the same year. The emissions data do not include land-use change and forestry (LULUCF), nor emissions from the consumption of imported goods. All countries which are party to the Paris Agreement report their greenhouse gas inventories at least biennially from 2024. World total emissions are estimated to be about 50 billion tonnes a year (including LULUCF), which divided by world population is about 6 and a half tonnes per person per year. In order to meet the Paris Agreement goal of under 1.5°C rise by 2050, average per person emissions would need to be around 2 tonnes per person by 2030. It has been suggested that countries over the averaged be carbon taxed and the funds raised given to countries under the average.

List of countries by production-based emissions

See also 

 List of countries by carbon dioxide emissions per capita
 List of countries by greenhouse gas emissions
 List of countries by carbon dioxide emissions
 Asian brown cloud
 Climate change
 Land use, land-use change, and forestry (LULUCF)

References 

Greenhouse gas emissions
Greenhouse gas emissions per capita
Greenhouse gas
countries, greenhouse
Greenhouse gas
Greenhouse gas emissions per person

Greenhouse gas